Buckwheat (Fagopyrum esculentum), or common buckwheat, is a flowering plant in the knotweed family Polygonaceae cultivated for its grain-like seeds and as a cover crop.  The name "buckwheat" is used for several other species, such as Fagopyrum tataricum, a domesticated food plant raised in Asia.

Despite its name, buckwheat is not closely related to wheat. It is not a cereal, nor is it even a member of the grass family. Buckwheat is related to sorrel, knotweed, and rhubarb, and is known as a pseudocereal because its seeds' culinary use is the same as cereals, owing to their high starch content.

Etymology 
The name "buckwheat" or "beech wheat" comes from its tetrahedral seeds, which resemble the much larger seeds of the beech nut from the beech tree, and the fact that it is used like wheat. The word may be a translation of Middle Dutch :  "beech" (Modern Dutch ; see PIE *bhago-) and  "wheat" (Mod. Dut. , antiquated ), or maybe a native formation on the same model as the Dutch word.

Description 
Buckwheat is a herbaceous annual flowering plant growing to about 60 cm, with red stems and pink and white flowers resembling those of knotweeds. The leaves are arrow-shaped and the fruits are achenes about 5–7 mm with 3 prominent sharp angles.

Distribution 
Fagopyrum esculentum is native to south-central China and Tibet, and has been introduced into suitable climates across Eurasia, Africa and the Americas.

History 

The wild ancestor of common buckwheat is F. esculentum ssp. ancestrale. F. homotropicum is interfertile with F. esculentum and the wild forms have a common distribution, in Yunnan, a southwestern province of China. The wild ancestor of tartary buckwheat is F. tataricum ssp. potanini.

Common buckwheat was domesticated and first cultivated in inland Southeast Asia, possibly around 6000 BCE, and from there spread to Central Asia and Tibet, and then to the Middle East and Europe. Domestication most likely took place in the western Yunnan region of China.

The oldest remains found in China so far date to circa 2600 BCE, while buckwheat pollen found in Japan dates from as early as 4000 BCE. It is the world's highest-elevation domesticate, being cultivated in Yunnan on the edge of the Tibetan Plateau or on the plateau itself. Buckwheat was one of the earliest crops introduced by Europeans to North America. Dispersal around the globe was complete by 2006, when a variety developed in Canada was widely planted in China. In India, buckwheat flour is known as kuttu ka atta and has long been culturally associated with many festivals like, Shivratri, Navaratri and  Janmashtami. On the day of these festivals, food items made only from buckwheat are consumed.

Cultivation 

Buckwheat is a short-season crop that grows well in low-fertility or acidic soils; too much fertilizer – especially nitrogen – reduces yields, and  the soil must be well drained. In hot climates buckwheat can be grown only by sowing late in the season, so that it blooms in cooler weather. The presence of pollinators greatly increases yield. Nectar from flowering buckwheat produces a dark-colored honey.

The buckwheat plant has a branching root system with a primary taproot that reaches deeply into moist soil. Buckwheat has tetrahedral seeds and produces a flower that is usually white, although can also be pink or yellow. Buckwheat branches freely, as opposed to tillering or producing suckers, enabling more complete adaption to its environment than other cereal crops.

Buckwheat is raised for grain where only a brief time is available for growth, either because the buckwheat is an early or a second crop in the season, or because the total growing season is limited. It establishes quickly, which suppresses summer weeds, and can be a reliable cover crop in summer to fit a small slot of warm season. Buckwheat has a growing period of only 10–12 weeks and it can be grown in high latitude or northern areas. Buckwheat is sometimes used as a "green manure", as a plant for erosion control, or as wildlife cover and feed.

Production

Historically, the Russian Empire was the world leader in buckwheat production. In 1970, the Soviet Union grew an estimated  of buckwheat. As of 2016, it remains a key crop.

During the 18th and 19th centuries, buckwheat was common in the northeastern United States. Cultivation declined sharply by the mid-20th century because of the use of nitrogen fertilizer, to which maize and wheat respond strongly. Over  were harvested in the United States in 1918.
However, buckwheat cultivation in the US has increased because of an "explosion in popularity of so-called ancient grains" reported during the years 2009–2014. In 2020, world production was 1.8 million tonnes, led by Russia with 49% of the world total, followed by China with 28% and Ukraine with 5%.

Biological control 
F. esculentum is often studied and used as a pollen and nectar source to increase natural predator numbers to control crop pests. Berndt et al. 2002 found that the results were not entirely promising in one vineyard in New Zealand but the same team - Berndt et al. 2006, four years later and studying a number of vineyards up and down New Zealand - did find a significant increase in 22 parasitoids, especially Dolichogenidea tasmanica, as did Irvin et al. 1999 for D. t. in Canterbury orchards. Gurr et al. 1998 showed that floral nectaries - and not shelter in or alternate hosts on F. esculentum - were responsible for this increase, and Stephens et al. 1998 for Anacharis spp. on Micromus tasmaniae. Stephens et al. 1998 also first demonstrated a great increase of A. spp. on M. t. (which also commonly predates on F. e.). Cullen et al. 2013 found that vineyards around Waipara had not continued planting buckwheat, suggesting a need for further technique development so that buckwheat will integrate well with real-world vineyard practice. English-Loeb et al. 2003 found that it does sustain greater numbers of Anagrus parasitoids on Erythroneura leafhoppers, and Balzan and Wäckers 2013 found the same for Necremnus artynes and Ferracini et al. 2012 for Necremnus tutae on Tuta absoluta, and thereby act as pest controls in tomato, potato, and to a lesser degree other Solanaceous and non-Solanaceous horticulturals. Kalinova and Moudry 2003 found that further companion planting with other flowers at the wrong time of year may actually cause F. esculentum to be killed by frosts it would have otherwise survived, and Colley and Luna 2000 found that it may delay its flowering to not coincide with the natural enemy it was planted to feed. Foti et al. 2016 found significant short-chain carboxylic acid variation to be the most likely explanation for biocontrol performance variation between cultivars.

Phytochemicals 

Buckwheat contains diverse phytochemicals, including rutin, tannins, catechin-7-O-glucoside in groats, and fagopyrins, which are located mainly in the cotyledons of the buckwheat plant. It has almost no levels of inorganic arsenic.

Aromatic compounds
Salicylaldehyde (2-hydroxybenzaldehyde) was identified as a characteristic component of buckwheat aroma. 2,5-dimethyl-4-hydroxy-3(2H)-furanone, (E,E)-2,4-decadienal, phenylacetaldehyde, 2-methoxy-4-vinylphenol, (E)-2-nonenal, decanal and  hexanal also contribute to its aroma. They all have odour activity value of more than 50, but the aroma of these substances in an isolated state does not resemble buckwheat.

Nutrition
With a 100-gram serving of dry buckwheat providing  of food energy, or  cooked, buckwheat is a rich source (20% or more of the Daily Value, DV) of protein, dietary fiber, four B vitamins and several dietary minerals, with content especially high (47 to 65% DV) in niacin, magnesium, manganese and phosphorus (table). Buckwheat is 72% carbohydrates, 10% dietary fiber, 3% fat, 13% protein, and 10% water.

Gluten-free
As buckwheat contains no gluten, it may be eaten by people with gluten-related disorders, such as celiac disease, non-celiac gluten sensitivity or dermatitis herpetiformis. Nevertheless, buckwheat products may have gluten contamination.

Potential adverse effects
Cases of severe allergic reactions to buckwheat and buckwheat-containing products have been reported. Buckwheat contains fluorescent phototoxic fagopyrins. Seeds, flour, and teas are generally safe when consumed in normal amounts, but fagopyrism can appear in people with diets based on high consumption of buckwheat sprouts, and particularly flowers or fagopyrin-rich buckwheat extracts. Symptoms of fagopyrism in humans may include skin inflammation in sunlight-exposed areas, cold sensitivity, and tingling or numbness in the hands.

Culinary use

The fruit is an achene, similar to sunflower seed, with a single seed inside a hard outer hull. The starchy endosperm is white and makes up most or all of buckwheat flour. The seed coat is green or tan, which darkens buckwheat flour. The hull is dark brown or black, and some may be included in buckwheat flour as dark specks. The dark flour is known as blé noir (black wheat) in French, along with the name sarrasin (saracen). Similarly, in Italy, it is known as grano saraceno (saracen grain). The grain can be prepared by simple dehulling, milling into farina, to whole-grain flour or to white flour. The grain can be fractionated into starch, germ and hull for specialized uses.

Buckwheat groats are commonly used in western Asia and eastern Europe. The porridge was common, and is often considered the definitive peasant dish. It is made from roasted groats that are cooked with broth to a texture similar to rice or bulgur. The dish was taken to America by Ukrainian, Russian, and Polish immigrants who called it kasha, and they mixed it with pasta or used it as a filling for cabbage rolls (stuffed cabbage), knishes, and blintzes; buckwheat prepared in this fashion is thus most commonly called kasha in America. Groats were the most widely used form of buckwheat worldwide during the 20th century, eaten primarily in Estonia, Latvia, Lithuania, Russia, Ukraine, Belarus, and Poland, called grechka (Greek [grain]) in Belarusian, Ukrainian and Russian languages.

Buckwheat noodles have been eaten in Tibet and northern China for centuries, where the growing season is too short to raise wheat. A wooden press is used to press the dough into hot boiling water when making buckwheat noodles. Old presses found in Tibet and Shanxi share the same basic design features. The Japanese and Koreans may have learned the process of making buckwheat noodles from them.

Buckwheat noodles play a major role in the cuisines of Japan (soba) and Korea (naengmyeon, makguksu and memil guksu). Soba noodles are the subject of deep cultural importance in Japan. The difficulty of making noodles from flour with no gluten has resulted in a traditional art developed around their manufacture by hand. A jelly called memilmuk in Korea is made from buckwheat starch.

Noodles also appear in Italy, with pasta di grano saraceno in Apulia region of Southern Italy and pizzoccheri in the Valtellina region of Northern Italy.

Buckwheat pancakes are eaten in several countries. They are known as buckwheat blini in Russia, galettes bretonnes in France, ployes in Acadia, poffertjes in the Netherlands, boûketes in the Wallonia region of Belgium, kuttu ki puri in India and kachhyamba in Nepal. Similar pancakes were a common food in American pioneer days. They are light and foamy. The buckwheat flour gives the pancakes an earthy, mildly mushroom-like taste.

Yeasted patties called hrechanyky are made in Ukraine.

Buckwheat is a permitted sustenance during fasting in several traditions. In India, on Hindu fasting days (Navaratri, Ekadashi, Janmashtami, Maha Shivaratri, etc.), fasting people in northern states of India eat foods made of buckwheat flour. Eating cereals such as wheat or rice is prohibited during such fasting days.  While strict Hindus do not even drink water during their fast, others give up cereals and salt and instead eat non-cereal foods such as buckwheat (kuttu). In the Russian Orthodox tradition, it is eaten on the St. Philip fast.

Buckwheat honey is dark, strong and aromatic. Because it does not complement other honeys,  it is normally produced as a monofloral honey.

Beverages

Beer 
In recent years, buckwheat has been used as a substitute for other grains in gluten-free beer. Although it is not an actual cereal (being a pseudocereal), buckwheat can be used in the same way as barley to produce a malt that can form the basis of a mash that will brew a beer without gliadin or hordein (together gluten) and therefore can be suitable for coeliacs or others sensitive to certain glycoproteins.

Whisky

Shōchū 
Buckwheat  is a Japanese distilled beverage produced since the 16th Century. The taste is milder than barley shōchū.

Tea 
Buckwheat tea, known as  kuqiao-cha (苦荞茶) in China, memil-cha in Korea and mugi-cha in Japan, is a tea made from roasted buckwheat.

Upholstery filling 

Buckwheat hulls are used as filling for a variety of upholstered goods, including pillows and zafu. The hulls are durable and do not insulate or reflect heat as much as synthetic filling. They are sometimes marketed as an alternative natural filling to feathers for those with allergies. However, medical studies to measure the health effects of pillows manufactured with unprocessed and uncleaned hulls concluded that such buckwheat pillows do contain higher levels of a potential allergen that may trigger asthma in susceptible individuals than do new synthetic-filled pillows.

See also

References

 
Crops originating from Asia
Flora of Asia
Fagopyrum
Pseudocereals